
Gmina Werbkowice is a rural gmina (administrative district) in Hrubieszów County, Lublin Voivodeship, in eastern Poland.

Villages
Gmina Werbkowice contains the villages and settlements of Adelina, Alojzów, Dobromierzyce, Gozdów, Honiatycze, Honiatycze-Kolonia, Honiatyczki, Hostynne, Hostynne-Kolonia, Konopne, Kotorów, Łotów, Łysa Góra, Malice, Peresołowice, Podhorce, Sahryń, Sahryń-Kolonia, Strzyżowiec, Terebiń, Terebiniec, Turkowice, Werbkowice, Wilków, Wronowice and Zagajnik.

Neighbouring gminas
Gmina Werbkowice is bordered by the gminas of Hrubieszów, Miączyn, Mircze, Trzeszczany and Tyszowce.

References

Polish official population figures 2006

Werbkowice
Hrubieszów County